The 2020–21 Northern Counties East Football League season was the 39th in the history of Northern Counties East Football League, a football competition in England.

Due to the restrictions on clubs' ability to play matches in the COVID-19 lockdowns, competitions at Steps 3–6 were curtailed on 24 February 2021.

Promotions and restructuring
The scheduled restructuring of non-League football took place at the end of the season, with a new division added to the Northern Premier League at Step 4 for 2021–22. Promotions from Steps 5 to 4 and 6 to 5 were based on points per game across all matches over the two cancelled seasons (2019-20 and 2020-21), while teams were promoted to Step 6 on the basis of a subjective application process. These resulted in three Northern Counties East teams joining the new Northern Premier Midlands division.

Premier Division

The Premier Division consisted of 20 clubs. The constitution of the division remained unchanged from the unfinished 2019–20 season.

League table

Stadia and locations

Division One

Division One featured 19 clubs which competed in the previous season, along with one new club:
 Emley, transferred from the North West Counties League

League table

Stadia and locations

League Cup

The 2020–21 Northern Counties East Football League League Cup should have been the 37th season of the league cup competition of the Northern Counties East Football League. Due to COVID-19 pandemic-related concerns, it was not played.

References

External links
 Northern Counties East Football League

2020-21
9
Northern Counties East Football League, 2020-21